Únicas is the eleventh studio album by Spanish duo Azúcar Moreno, released on Sony International in 2002.

Únicas was the first Azúcar Moreno album since 1990's Bandido not to be partly or entirely recorded in the United States, but in Spain and Italy, and it also features strings by the Prague Philharmonic Orchestra. Únicas however saw the Salazar sisters continuing their longtime and successful collaboration with Spanish singer and composer Miguel Gallardo, this time also in the role as main producer, assisted by Bruno Zuchetti and Danilo Ballo in Milan and Rome. The album also featured further songwriting contributions from the team Pedro del Moral and David Ferrero, who previously had remixed several of their hits like "Amén", "Abracadabra", "Mamma Mia", "Olé" and "Mecachis!".

The lead single from the album was "Besame", also released as an extended dance mix, followed by a cover of The Champs' 1958 rock hit "Tequila" and the melancholy ballad "Volvería A Nacer". The album continued the duo's fusion of rumba flamenca and contemporary urban dance music genres like disco and R&B, the track "Que Me Quiten Lo Bailao" also incorporates influences from Brazil and "Habbibi Te Quiero" ("Habibi" meaning "darling" or "my beloved" in Arabic) again features rhythms and sounds from the Middle East. The album closes with the high camp anthem "Divina De La Muerte", with the verse explaining that there is nothing better to cheer up a dull day than going on a shopping spree, and the sisters namedropping their favourite designer brands; Dolce & Gabbana, Chanel, Prada, Shiseido, Gucci, Louis Vuitton, Galliano, Dior, Moschino, Valentino, Escada, Versace, Cartier, Cavalli etc. The chorus goes on to proclaim; "Yo soy una chica con suerte - estoy divina de la muerte!" (Translated: "I'm a lucky girl - I'm deadly divine!")

Únicas was only a moderate commercial success compared to Azúcar Moreno's previous efforts, selling some 100,000 copies in their native Spain. Unicas was also one of Sony Music Entertainment's 2002 releases known to be affected by the company's copy protection software, both the album cover and the CD itself clearly state .

Únicas came to be Azúcar Moreno's final album with Miguel Gallardo, who over a period of some ten years had written, co-written, produced or co-produced around twenty-five songs for the duo, including some of their greatest hits. After a long struggle with cancer Gallardo died in 2005.

Track listing
Original CD issue.

Personnel

 Azùcar Moreno - lead vocals, backing vocals 
 Cinzia Astolfi - backing vocals  
 Angela Bautista - backing vocals  
 Triana Bautista - backing vocals 
 Emilio "Webo" Cuervo - backing vocals
 Esmeralda Grao - backing vocals
 Araceli Lavado - backing vocals
 Miguel Morant - backing vocals  
 Danilo Ballo - keyboards, programming 
 Luis Cabañas - programming  
 Jesús Catalá - percussion  
 Miguel Angel Collado - keyboards, programming, backing vocals  
 Danny Costa - percussion, palmas  
 Pedro del Moral - programming   
 David Ferrero - programming  
 Enzo Filippone - drums    
 Pedro J. González - Spanish guitar  
 José Agustín Guereñu - bass guitar 
 Manuel Machado - trumpet, soloist  
 Segundo Mijares - saxophone, soloist
 Juan Miguel Mogica - programming  
 William Paredes - trombone  
 David Perez - accordion  
 Bruno Zuchetti - keyboards, programming 
 Ludovico Vagnone - acoustic guitar, electric guitar, Spanish guitar, backing vocals, recording
 The Prague Philharmonic Orchestra - orchestra
 Mario Klemens - orchestral conductor
 Richter Arnolt - violin, orchestra
 Pok Bahuslav - violin, orchestra
 Kristyna Belohlavkova - violin, orchestra
 Marek Elznic - violin, orchestra
 Rammy Emanuelle - violin, orchestra
 Silar Franchíl - violin, orchestra
 Froneh Frant - violin, orchestra
 Trykar Marek - violin, orchestra
 Vladyka Milan - violin, orchestra 
 Mrázek Ivo - violin, orchestra  
 Hron Jakub - violin, orchestra
 Kóhle Jan - violin, orchestra
 Pavicek Jeromin - violin, orchestra
 Holenà Jirí - violin, orchestra
 Zajíe Jiri - violin, orchestra
 Millite Kaudersova - violin, orchestra 
 Mchutil Josef - violin, orchestra
 Bohumil Kotmel - violin, orchestra
 Forbelská Ludmila - violin, orchestra
 Mracková Ludmila - violin, orchestra
 Srámek Morek - violin, orchestra 
 Branislav Ondrèv - violin, orchestra
 Ysech Pavel - violin, orchestra
 Klas Petr - violin, orchestra  
 Josef Pokluda - violin, orchestra  
 Sisler Radim - violin, orchestra  
 Tatána Richterová - violin, orchestra
 Dana Sislerová - violin, orchestra  
 Lauda Stepón - violin, orchestra  
 Barinka Tomas - violin, orchestra  
 Richard Valasek - violin, orchestra  
 Zajacik Valdimir - violin, orchestra  
 Dudek Van - violin, orchestra  
 Köhler Van - violin, orchestra
 Jkosa Virí - violin, orchestra  
 Vlastimil Zeman - violin, orchestra

Production
 Miguel Gallardo - record producer, musical director, realization
 Bruno Zuchetti - musical arranger, producer, musical director, realization, recording
 Danilo Ballo - musical arranger, producer, musical director, realization, recording
 Miguel Angel Collado - musical arranger, musical director 
 Emanuele Ruffinengo - production coordination, musical director, realization 
 Ludovico Vagnone - recording
 José Peña Engineer - digital editing, mixing
 Riccardo Dacunto - recording
 Fernando Chávez - recording
 Sabino Cannone - mixing, sound design 
 Mark Bishop - sound design  
 Jose Vinader - engineer
 Francisco Gude - engineer 
 Marcos Liviano - assistant 
 Michael Hradisky - assistant
 Antonio Baglio - mastering engineer  
 Carlos Martin - graphic design, art direction 
 Juanjo Manez - stylist
 Adolfo Cabiedes - interpretation  
 Joan Alsina - photography
 Recorded at Zodiak Studios and Altavox Studios (Milan), Trendy Studios (Rome), Ludus Studios & Trak Studios (Madrid). Strings recorded at Smecky Studios (Prague).

Certifications

References

2002 albums
Azúcar Moreno albums